Bloodsport III is a 1997 action film produced and directed by Alan Mehrez. It is the third film in the Bloodsport franchise. It was released direct-to-video in 1997 and starred Daniel Bernhardt for the second time as Alex Cardo.

Plot
Bloodsport III reintroduces the character Alex Cardo (Daniel Bernhardt) from Bloodsport II and is largely told in flashback format. Alex wakes up late one night after having dreams of the Kumite years prior.  He goes into his 10-year-old son Jason's bedroom to find his son still awake, reading. After questioning him, Jason reveals that he has been suspended for fighting in school. He insists he fought off 3 bullies in self-defense and, to his surprise, Alex is understanding of the situation. Alex suggests that he and Jason go camping together to bond. Alex begins to tell Jason about his former life as a criminal, a prisoner, his tutelage under Master Sun (James Hong), and, finally, as the champion of the last Kumite. Alex explains to his son that years after his tournament win, he traveled to India and gambled in a casino, when masked men arrived and stole money and a package from the casino, but not before Alex beat up several of the men. After the robbery, the casino owner convinces Alex to retrieve the package (a bag of diamonds) from the robbers, since they belong to a mob boss named Duvalier (John Rhys-Davies). Alex does so, and Duvalier invites him to a dinner party he's hosting as thanks.

At the party, Duvalier shows Alex his top fighter, the Beast, and tries to convince Alex to fight in his upcoming Kumite. Alex refuses, since he does not fight for profit, much to Duvalier's ire. To provoke him into fighting, Duvalier has Sun, Alex's mentor, teacher, and spiritual "father", killed. Alex turns to Leung (Pat Morita) to whom he was indebted in Bloodsport II: The Next Kumite. Leung directs him to the great shaman, Makato "the Judge" (Hee Il Cho), to whom Alex must turn for guidance. (The Judge is Sun's brother who developed his own variation of Sun's Iron Hand technique). The judge teaches him to fully channel the energy in his mind and body in order to rout the Beast in the Kumite.

By this point however, Duvalier has invested everything in the Beast and no longer wants Alex in his Kumite for fear he will upset the odds. When he is unable to block Alex's entry, he has his men stationed at the entrances to the tournament arena. Alex gets round this by posing as one of the entourage of another fighter. Both Alex and the Beast make their way through the Kumite, and face each other in the finals. Alex is initially outmatched by the Beast's great physical strength and endurance, and takes a severe beating as a result. Eventually, he remembers his training, and is able to knock out the Beast. He refrains from killing Duvalier, knowing that it won't bring Sun back.

In the present, Alex and his son finish their camping trip and drive away.

Cast
Daniel Bernhardt – Alex Cardo
John Rhys-Davies – Duvalier
J. J. Perry – J. J. Tucker
Chad Stahelski - Max Omega
James Hong – Master Sun
Pat Morita – David Leung
 Amber van Lent – Crystal
 Uni Park – Shari
 Rajiv Chandrasekhar – Franco
 David Schatz – Jason
 Steven Ito – Yoong
 Erik Paulson - Stellio
Hee Il Cho – Judge Macado
Gerald Okamura – Voice Of Judge
 Nicholas R. Oleson – The Beast
 Cricket Keating – Croupier
 Saku Richardson – Croupier
 Wasantha Kumaravila - Sarath

Titles around the world
Brazil: O Grande Dragāo Branco 3 (The Great White Dragon 3)
Denmark: Bloodsport III: Kamp Til Døden (Bloodsport III: Fight Till Death)
France: Bloodsport III: L'Ultime Kumite (Bloodsport III: The Ultimate Kumite)
Norway: Bloodsport III: Kumite
Portugal: Bloodsport III: O Combate Final (Bloodsport III: The Final Fight)
Russia: Кровавый спорт 3
Spain: Contacto Sangriento 3 (Bloody Contact 3)

External links
 

1997 films
1997 action films
1997 martial arts films
Bloodsport (film series)
American action films
American martial arts films
1990s English-language films
Karate films
Martial arts tournament films
Underground fighting films
Films shot in Sri Lanka
Direct-to-video sequel films
1990s American films